Diapaga Airport  is a public use airport located near Diapaga, Tapoa, Burkina Faso.

See also
List of airports in Burkina Faso

References

External links 
 Airport record for Diapaga Airport at Landings.com

Airports in Burkina Faso
Tapoa Province